Melton–Fortune Farmstead is a historic home and farm located near Golden Valley, Rutherford County, North Carolina.  The oldest section of the house was built about 1796, and is a rectangular, hall-and-parlor plan, log structure that forms two rooms of the central core. The house is a 1 1/2-story, weatherboarded structure with an engaged porch and Federal style design elements.  Also on the property are the contributing log barn, threshing machine, and archaeological sites.

It was added to the National Register of Historic Places in 1985.

References

Farms on the National Register of Historic Places in North Carolina
Federal architecture in North Carolina
Houses completed in 1796
Buildings and structures in Rutherford County, North Carolina
National Register of Historic Places in Rutherford County, North Carolina
1796 establishments in North Carolina